Victor Gomes Lemos (born 14 April 1987), known as Victor Bolt or formerly Victor Lemos, is a Brazilian footballer who plays for Botafogo-SP as a defensive midfielder.

Club career
Born in Rio de Janeiro, Victor Lemos made his senior debuts with Olaria, after representing Flamengo in the seven-a-side category. In June 2011 he moved abroad for the first time of his career, joining Segunda Liga side Belenenses.

After scoring four goals in 24 matches Victor returned to Brazil, and signed for Bahia on 19 July 2012. He made his Série A debut on 15 August, starting in a 2–0 away win against Ponte Preta.

After appearing sparingly Victor Bolt returned to Olaria, but moved to Madureira on 9 January 2014. After being the club's topscorer in the year's Série C, he signed a one-year loan deal with Vasco da Gama.

On 19 May 2015 Victor Bolt was loaned to Portuguesa, until December. On 6 November of that year he moved to Vila Nova.

Honours
Vila Nova
 Campeonato Goiano Série B: 2015
 Campeonato Brasileiro Série C: 2015

References

External links

1987 births
Living people
Footballers from Rio de Janeiro (city)
Brazilian footballers
Association football midfielders
Campeonato Brasileiro Série A players
Campeonato Brasileiro Série B players
Campeonato Brasileiro Série C players
Olaria Atlético Clube players
Esporte Clube Bahia players
Madureira Esporte Clube players
CR Vasco da Gama players
Associação Portuguesa de Desportos players
Vila Nova Futebol Clube players
Goiás Esporte Clube players
Botafogo Futebol Clube (SP) players
Liga Portugal 2 players
Heilongjiang Ice City F.C. players
China League One players
C.F. Os Belenenses players
Brazilian expatriate footballers
Brazilian expatriate sportspeople in Portugal
Expatriate footballers in Portugal
Expatriate footballers in China
Brazilian expatriate sportspeople in China